Three ships of the Moore-McCormack companies have borne the name Mormacdove

 was launched in 1939 as a Type C2 ship. She was acquired by the US Navy in 1941 as an Arcturus-class attack cargo ship and renamed . She was decommissioned in 1946, sold into civilian service in 1948 as the Tjipanas , renamed Tong Jit in 1967 and scrapped in 1973.
 was launched 1 June 1942 at the Consolidated Steel Corporation's Wilmington, California yard as a Type C1-B ship, but completed as a War Shipping Administration troop transport. She was transferred to the United States Maritime Commission in 1946 and was scrapped in 1965.
 was launched in 1944 as a Type C2-S-B1 ship under the name Ringleader. She was purchased in 1947 and named Mormacdove and was scrapped in 1968.

Ship names